Drmić or Drmic is a surname.

It may refer to:

 Anthony Drmic (born 1992), Australian basketball player
 Frank Drmic (born 1978), Australian basketball player
 Goran Drmić (born 1988), Bosnian footballer
 Josip Drmić (born 1992), Swiss footballer

Croatian surnames